Queensboro FC (QBFC) is an upcoming American professional soccer team of the USL Championship league based in the borough of Queens in New York City. It was funded and founded in November 2019, and unveiled an official crest and color scheme on October 6, 2020.

QBFC was expected to make its debut as an expansion team in the 2021 USL Championship series. However, their start date was moved from the 2021 season to the 2022 season, and later to the 2023 season. The team is listed as an expansion team on the USL website, but is not listed as participating in the 2023 USL Championship season of March to November 2023.

Stadium 
As of April 2022, the team was expected to play in a 7,500 seat stadium to be constructed on the campus of York College in Jamaica, Queens.

Men's team

Head coaches
Josep Gombau was named the team's first head coach and sporting director on July 6, 2020. On June 8, 2022, he left to coach Odisha FC of the Indian Super League.

Women's team

On June 8, 2021, QBFC announced they would field a women's side to compete in 2022 as an original franchise in the new USL W League.

Year-by-year

Head coaches
 Includes Regular Season and Playoffs. Excludes friendlies.

References

External links
 

USL Championship teams
2019 establishments in New York City
2010s in Queens
Sports teams in New York City
Association football clubs established in 2019
Men's soccer clubs in New York (state)
Jamaica, Queens